Stavenhagen is an Amt in the Mecklenburgische Seenplatte district, in Mecklenburg-Vorpommern, Germany. The seat of the Amt is in Stavenhagen.

The Amt Stavenhagen consists of the following municipalities:
Bredenfelde 
Briggow 
Grammentin 
Gülzow 
Ivenack 
Jürgenstorf 
Kittendorf 
Knorrendorf 
Mölln 
Ritzerow 
Rosenow 
Stavenhagen
Zettemin

References

Ämter in Mecklenburg-Western Pomerania
Mecklenburgische Seenplatte (district)